Sega, also known as Segga, village is located in Kaithal tehsil of Kaithal district in Haryana, India. , Sega village is also a gram panchayat.

Demographics 
Most of the population of the village is Hindu; the widely spoken language is Haryanvi.

Schools 
 Govt. Sr. Secondary School, Sega
 Saraswati Public School

Transportation 
The nearby railway stations to Sega village are New Kaithal Halt railway station (NKLE), Kaithal railway station (KLE) and Geong railway station (GXG).

From Kaithal bus stand, bus services are also available to destinations including Delhi, Hisar, Chandigarh, and Jammu.

References 

Villages in Kaithal district